Cascaret is a surname. Notable people with the surname include:

Raúl Cascaret (1962–1995), Cuban wrestler
Yuleidys Cascaret (born 1978), Cuban rower